Do Bolukan (also Romanized as Do Bolūkān and Dow Bolūkān; also known as Dombaleh Kūh, Do Molūkān, Dow Malkān, and Dumalikān) is a village in Pachehlak-e Gharbi Rural District, in the Central District of Azna County, Lorestan Province, Iran. At the 2006 census, its population was 193, in 33 families.

References 

Towns and villages in Azna County